Christina Cassidy (born January 12, 1982) is an American sports shooter. She competed in the women's 10 metre air pistol event at the 2000 Summer Olympics.

References

External links
 

1982 births
Living people
American female sport shooters
Olympic shooters of the United States
Shooters at the 2000 Summer Olympics
Sportspeople from Oceanside, California
21st-century American women